The Turkestan thin-toed gecko (Tenuidactylus fedtschenkoi), also known commonly as Fedtschenko's bow-fingered gecko and Fedtschenko's grasping gecko, is a species of lizard in the family Gekkonidae. The species is native to Central Asia.

Etymology
The specific name, fedtschenkoi, is in honor of Russian naturalist Alexei Pavlovich Fedtschenko.

Geographic range
T. fedtschenkoi is found in southeastern Turkmenistan, southern Uzbekistan, and western Tajikistan.

Habitat
It has also been found on walls of houses and ruins.

Reproduction
T. fedtschenkoi is oviparous. Clutch size is two eggs.

References

Further reading
Dujsebayeva TN (1995). "The Microanatomy of Regenerated Bristled Receptors of Two Gecko Species, Cyrtopodion fedtschenkoi and Sphaerodactylus roosevelti (Reptilia: Gekkonidae)". Russian Journal of Herpetology 2 (1): 58–64.
Rösler H (2000). "Kommentierte Liste der rezent, subrezent und fossil bekannten Geckotaxa (Reptilia: Gekkonomorpha)". Gekkota 2: 28–153. (Cyrtopodion fedtschenkoi, p. 69). (in German).
Sindaco R, Jeremčenko VK (2008). The Reptiles of the Western Palearctic. 1. Annotated Checklist and Distributional Atlas of the Turtles, Crocodiles, Amphisbaenians and Lizards of Europe, North Africa, Middle East and Central Asia. (Monographs of the Societas Herpetologica Italica). Latina, Italy: Edizioni Belvedere. 580 pp. . (Cyrtopodion fedtschenkoi).
Strauch A (1887). "Bemerkungen über die Geckoniden-Sammlung im zoologischen Museum der kaiserlichen Akademie der Wissenschaften zur St. Petersburg ". Mémoires de l'Académie Impériale des Sciences de St.-Pétersbourg, VIIe Série [=Seventh Series] 35 (2): 1–72. (Gymnodactylus fedtschenkoi, new species, pp. 46–47). (in German).

Tenuidactylus
Reptiles described in 1887